Warid was a GSM, HSPA+ and LTE based mobile operator in Pakistan. It was the seventh mobile carrier to enter the Pakistani market. It commenced commercial operations on May 23, 2005 by the Abu Dhabi Group, a business conglomerate in the Middle East and a major investor in Pakistan. It was the first venture of the group in the field of Telecommunication.

Warid Pakistan was Pakistan's fourth largest GSM mobile service provider and fifth largest mobile service in terms of subscriber base of over 12.9 million. It has a market share of 9% among cellular operators.

On November 26, 2015 VimpelCom and Dhabi Group agreed to merge Mobilink and Warid Pakistan into a single company. On January 6, 2017 the combined CEO of Mobilink and Warid Pakistan announced the launch of new brand Jazz. Mobilink ceased to exist on January 10, 2017 whereas Warid Pakistan as a brand continued for a year.

History
Pakistan Telecommunication Authority awarded two mobile telephony licenses to Telenor Pakistan and Space Telecom on April 24, 2004. The license for Space Telecom was cancelled after it missed a dead line to make a 50% down payment of the offered price. Thereafter PTA offered next highest bid winner company, Warid Pakistan.

The license was bid and acquired through parent company of Warid Pakistan, Abu Dhabi Group led by the then CEO Mr Bashir Tahir for US$291 million.

On May 23, 2005 Warid Pakistan commercially started operating. Mr Hamid Farooq is appointed as the CEO of the company. Initially it covered 28 major cities of the country, which is so far the largest coverage in the first phase of roll-out by the first investment of US$150 million. Within 80 days, Warid Pakistan secured 1 million customers with 7% market share.

In second phase of investment of US$1 billion, Warid Pakistan launched operations in other cities of Pakistan. It secured another 3.4 million subscribers with 10% market share. The first anniversary of Warid Pakistan marked 9.7 million subscribers.

In 2007, Singapore Telecommunications bought a 30-per cent stake in Warid Pakistan for about $758 million. That stake purchase gave Warid Pakistan an enterprise value of about $2.5 billion.

Warid Pakistan's first CEO Hamid Farooq resigned in November 2007. Mr. Marwan Zawaydeh joined the company as the second CEO. Warid Pakistan further invested US$1 billion in network expansion by the end of 2009.

Warid Pakistan got a new CEO Mr. Muneer Farooqi in October 2012.

SingTel sold back that stake in January 2013 for $150 million and a right to receive 7.5 per cent of the net proceeds from any future sale, public offering, or merger of Warid Pakistan.

Merger with Mobilink 
Warid Pakistan previously announced its merger with Mobilink in November 2015. The case was under review at Pakistan Telecommunication Authority. After scrutiny PTA finally approved the merger in July 2016. The companies have become a single brand. This merger also resulted in the sharing of network resources, Warid Pakistan customers can now connect to Jazz's 3G network and Jazz customers to Warid Pakistan's 4G network, This network roaming between both the operators was enabled in November 2016. In January 2017, Jazz's CEO, Aamir Ibrahim announced that Warid Pakistan's journey would come to an end, and that both companies would be launched under a new brand name, called Jazz.

Warid Pakistan customers will also have to replace their SIM cards at all new Jazz Service Centers, where the SIM card will be provided to all Warid Pakistan customers free of cost.

See also
Warid Telecom International
Jazz (company)
List of mobile phone companies in Pakistan

References

External links
 

Mobile phone companies of Pakistan
2005 establishments in Pakistan
Pakistan–United Arab Emirates relations
Warid Telecom
Pakistani subsidiaries of foreign companies
Jazz (mobile network operator)